Hungerfordia is a genus of small land snails with an operculum, a terrestrial gastropod mollusk in the family Diplommatinidae endemic to the Republic of Palau. Many of the members of this genus inhabit limestone cliffs or rubble, especially in the Rock Islands (Chelbacheb) in Airai, Koror, and Peleliu states. As of 2022, there are 41 described species in this genus. A series of revisions in 2013 - 2015 described several new species, as well as transferring Palauan members of the genus Diplommatina or Palaina (including Palau endemics Diplommatina alata, D. aurea, D. crassilabris, D. gibboni, D. inflatula, D. lamellata, D. lutea, D. pyramis, and D. ringens) into Hungerfordia.

Species
Species within the genus Hungerfordia include:
 Hungerfordia alata
 Hungerfordia angaurensis
 Hungerfordia aspera
 Hungerfordia aurea
 Hungerfordia basodonta
 Hungerfordia brachyptera
 Hungerfordia chilorhytis
 Hungerfordia crassilabris
 Hungerfordia crenata
 Hungerfordia echinata
 Hungerfordia elegantissima
 Hungerfordia eurystoma
 Hungerfordia expansilabris
 Hungerfordia fragilipennis
 Hungerfordia gibboni
 Hungerfordia globosa
 Hungerfordia goniobasis
 Hungerfordia inflatula
 Hungerfordia irregularis
 Hungerfordia lamellata
 Hungerfordia longissima
 Hungerfordia loxodonta
 Hungerfordia lutea
 Hungerfordia microbasodonta
 Hungerfordia ngereamensis
 Hungerfordia nodulosa
 Hungerfordia nudicollum
 Hungerfordia omphaloptyx
 Hungerfordia papilio
 Hungerfordia pelewensis
 Hungerfordia polymorpha
 Hungerfordia pteropurpuroides
 Hungerfordia pyramis
 Hungerfordia ringens
 Hungerfordia robiginosa
 Hungerfordia rudicostata
 Hungerfordia spinoscapula
 Hungerfordia spiroperculata
 Hungerfordia subalata
 Hungerfordia triplochilus
 Hungerfordia unisulcata

Subspecies 
There are currently 19 named subspecies of Hungerfordia distributed among 8 different species: 

 Hungerfordia crassilabris attenuata
 Hungerfordia crassilabris crassilabris
 Hungerfordia crassilabris tridentata
 Hungerfordia echinata echinata
 Hungerfordia echinata tubulispina
 Hungerfordia elegantissima anomphala
 Hungerfordia elegantissima elegantissima
 Hungerfordia goniobasis dmasechensis
 Hungerfordia goniobasis exserta
 Hungerfordia goniobasis goniobasis
 Hungerfordia lutea hemilaevis
 Hungerfordia lutea lutea
 Hungerfordia papilio papilio
 Hungerfordia papilio stenoptera
 Hungerfordia pyramis pteroma
 Hungerfordia pyramis pyramis
 Hungerfordia ringens ringens
 Hungerfordia ringens rotundata
 Hungerfordia ringens ventrinodus

References

  Nomenclator Zoologicus info]

 
Diplommatinidae
Taxonomy articles created by Polbot